Franklin Road Christian School (FRCS) is a private, co-educational K–12 Christian school in Murfreesboro, Tennessee, located on Highway 96 ("Franklin Road"). This school is known for conservative, Christian-based education. It is a ministry of Franklin Road Baptist Church.

References

External Links 
Official website

Baptist schools in the United States
Christian schools in Tennessee
Educational institutions established in 1974
Private K-12 schools in Tennessee
Buildings and structures in Murfreesboro, Tennessee
Tennessee Association of Christian Schools
Schools in Rutherford County, Tennessee
1974 establishments in Tennessee